The Team sprint large hill/2 × 7.5 km event of the FIS Nordic World Ski Championships 2015 was held on 28 February 2015.

Results

Ski jumping
The ski jumping was started at 10:00.

Cross-country skiing
The Cross-country skiing was started at 16:00.

References

Team sprint large hill 2 x 7,5 km